Parry Shen (born June 26, 1973) is an American actor, author, screenwriter, and producer. Shen's first major acting role was in Better Luck Tomorrow as Ben Manibag, the film's leading character. He also starred in another Asian American film, Surrogate Valentine. He has since starred in the horror film Hatchet and its sequels Hatchet II, Hatchet III, and Victor Crowley. He had a recurring role as Tyler Li in the television series Tru Calling. Since 2013, he has portrayed the role of Brad Cooper on General Hospital.

He is also known for his voice acting in the video games Sleeping Dogs and Mortal Kombat X.

Early life
Shen was born June 26, 1973, in New York City, in the borough of Queens. He went to Archbishop Molloy High School, then an all-boys (but now co-educational) Roman Catholic school in Briarwood, in Queens, New York, and at the University at Buffalo. His mother is from Hong Kong. His father is from Shanghai. When he moved to California, he worked as a dorm parent at Villanova Preparatory School, a private college preparatory school in Ojai. Shen is of Chinese descent and can speak Cantonese.

Career

Acting
Shen is best known as the lead character, Ben Manibag, in Justin Lin's seminal Asian American film, Better Luck Tomorrow (2002). Shen was also a main part of the cast of Hatchet, in which he also returned for Adam Green's Hatchet II and Hatchet III. Shen has appeared in Ed Decter's The New Guy (2002) opposite DJ Qualls and Zooey Deschanel (as Glen). Shen also appears as the lead husband character, Luke, in Richard Wong's Yes We're Open opposite Lynn Chen and in Dave Boyle's Surrogate Valentine (2011) as Bradley, Pearry Reginald Teo's The Gene Generation (as Jackie, the brother of Bai Ling's character), and Eric Shapiro's Rule of 3 (2008) (as David).

Shen has appeared on the TV shows NCIS: Los Angeles (as Ty), MADTv (as Chin-Hwa Dak), Criminal Minds (as Bobby Kim), Brothers & Sisters (as Dan Silk), Veronica Mars (as Hsiang 'Charleston' Chu), Thief (as Billy 'Shrimp Boy' Kwan), Without a Trace (as Steven Park), Tru Calling (as Tyler Li), Holliston (as Trent), NCIS (TV series) (as Ben Richmond), Sabrina the Teenage Witch (as Seth), Party of Five (as Kyle), Cousin Skeeter (as Billy Blowfield), Chicago Hope (as Harry Lensky), The King of Queens (as stockboy), Malibu, CA (as Kip), Beverly Hills 90210 (as Staffer), Suddenly Susan (as Robert), Caroline in the City (as Tim), and Buffy the Vampire Slayer (as student). Shen also played various characters on the TV series Asia Street Comedy (2004).

Shen also voices the character Takeda Takahashi in "Mortal Kombat X" (2015),  Winston Chu in Square Enix's Sleeping Dogs (2012), Mogu Zai in Blizzard's World of Warcraft: Mists of Pandaria (2012), and Tang/Privateer/Thug in Far Cry 3 (2012).

On May 6, 2013, Shen debuted in the recurring role of Brad Cooper on General Hospital. He will be in the upcoming feature film Automation.

Author
Shen is Managing Editor of Secret Identities: The Asian American Superhero Anthology, published by The New Press in April 2009. Its sequel, Shattered: The Asian American Comics Anthology, was published in November 2012.

Screenwriting and producing
Shen has written and produced the feature film entitled Unidentified (2013), directed by Jason Richard Miller.

Speaking engagements
Shen speaks at numerous universities about the entertainment industry and shares his experiences as an Asian American in the media.

Personal life
Shen has been married to his wife, Kim, since August 2, 2002, and they have two daughters.

Filmography

Film

Television

Video Games

References

Notes
  David DeCoteau credited as Victoria Sloan.

Citations

External links
Official website

Blog

1973 births
American male actors of Hong Kong descent
Male actors from New York City
American male film actors
American people of Hong Kong descent
American male television actors
American male video game actors
American male voice actors
Archbishop Molloy High School alumni
People from Queens, New York
University at Buffalo alumni
Living people
20th-century American male actors
21st-century American male actors